Shambhu Nath Singh Yadav is an Indian politician. He was elected to the Bihar Legislative Assembly from Brahampur as a Member of Bihar Legislative Assembly as a member of the Rashtriya Janata Dal. Before starting in politics, Yadav worked as a constable in Bihar Police from 1983 to 2009.

References

1964 births
Living people
People from Buxar district
Bihar MLAs 2015–2020
Bihar MLAs 2020–2025
Rashtriya Janata Dal politicians